The 1913 Kendall Orange and Black football team represented Henry Kendall College (later renamed the University of Tulsa) during the 1913 college football season.

Schedule

References

Kendall
Tulsa Golden Hurricane football seasons
Kendall Orange and Black football